Public Works Department or PWD is a government department responsible for the construction of buildings and structures of government organisation and agencies in Bangladesh and is located in Dhaka, Bangladesh. It is under the Ministry of Housing and Public Works. Most of the work done by the department are designed by the government Department of Architecture.

History
Public Works Department was established in 1948 when Bangladesh was a part of Pakistan. It is led by a chief engineer.

Vision and Mision

Vision
Ensure Organizational and residential facilities including construction of befitting infrastructure combatting all the challenges of developing countries under the development plan of government keeping vision 2021 forward.

Mission
Construction of all types of government office building, housing and other infrastructure with the best implementation of the latest engineering technology in an environmental friendly, safe and sustainable manner and proper maintenance of all government KPI installations and all types of public infrastructure.

Working Area
Construction and maintenance of government buildings and establishments
Ensure proper maintenance and management of government quarantined properties.
Maintain the standard and quality of construction materials.
Construction and Maintenance of other Government Structures including Key Point Installations.
Prepare structural and electromechanical design of government installations.
Reconstruction, maintenance and renovation of Various Monuments and Historical Buildings.
Maintenance and Development of Public Parks.
Fix the rate of rent of government office and residential building.
Collection of Non Tax Revenue.
Prepare the Rate of Schedule of Civil and Electrical / Mechanical Work.

References

Government agencies of Bangladesh
1948 establishments in East Pakistan
Organisations based in Dhaka
Public works ministries
Government departments of Bangladesh